Mary Holmes may refer to:
 Mary Adams Holmes (1910–2002), Artist and Professor
 Mary Anne Holmes (1773–1805), Irish poet and writer
 Mary Emilie Holmes (1850–1906), American geologist
 Mary Emma Holmes (1839-1937), American reformer, suffragist, and religious teacher
 Mary Jane Holmes (1828–1907), American author
 Mary Rehling Holmes, American golf coach
 Mary Holmes (golf), former golf coach

See also 
 Mary Holmes College in Mississippi, founded in 1892